Yan Yan may refer to:

 Yan Yan (disciple of Confucius) (言偃)
 Yan Yan (Three Kingdoms) (嚴顏)
 Yan Yan (snack)

See also
 Hung Yan-yan
 Yan Yan Chan
 Yan Yan Mak